Sean Doyle is an Irish businessman, and the chairman and CEO of British Airways.

Biography
The son of a Garda sergeant originally from Wexford, Doyle was born and grew up in Youghal, Ireland. He earned a bachelor's degree from University College Cork (UCC), before going on to train as a management accountant.

He joined British Airways in 1998, and joined the executive management committee in 2016 as director of network, fleet and alliances. He became CEO of Aer Lingus (also part of the IAG airline group) in January 2019. In October 2020, it was announced that Doyle would succeed Álex Cruz as CEO of British Airways.

He is married and has one son.

References

Living people
British Airways people
Irish airline chief executives
Alumni of University College Cork
People from Cork (city)
Year of birth missing (living people)